Arteen Ekizian (September 28, 1901 – November 16, 1981), better known by the ring name Ali Baba, was an Armenian American professional wrestler and World Heavyweight Champion who was active in the early portion of the twentieth century.

Early life 
Ekizian was born in Samsun, Ottoman Empire. During the Armenian genocide, his father and younger brother were murdered and Ekizian was sold as a slave to Arabs. After four years of hard labor, he escaped and moved to the United States in 1920 with help from his uncle Garabed in Massachusetts.

Career 
Ekizian began professional wrestling while serving in the United States Navy. He became the Fleet Championship in the middleweight, light heavyweight, and heavyweight divisions. After an international match in Copenhagen, Ekizian was awarded the title of World Champion Navy Wrestler and, in 1927, was honored at a White House Reception by President Calvin Coolidge. Ekizian started a professional wrestling career in 1932 after leaving the navy and moved to Los Angeles. On April 24, 1936, Ekizian defeated World Heavyweight Champion Dick Shikat in front of over 8,000 spectators in Detroit, Michigan. A rematch for the title took place on May 5 in Madison Square Garden. Ekizian won again and was formally declared the World Heavyweight Champion.

Personal life 
He was married to Alice Elizabeth Bagdoian. They had three children together. Ekizian was a devout Christian.

Championships and accomplishments
New York State Athletic Commission
New York State Athletic Commission World Heavyweight Championship (1 time)
 Other
World Heavyweight Wrestling Championship (original version) (1 time)

References

External links
 
 

1901 births
1981 deaths
Sportspeople from Samsun
Armenian professional wrestlers
Armenian genocide survivors
Ethnic Armenian sportspeople
Emigrants from the Ottoman Empire to the United States